Clics modernos (Spanish for "modern clicks") is the second solo studio album by the Argentine musician Charly García, released on November 5, 1983 on SG Discos and Interdisc. It was a decisive work to consolidate the modern trends that would mark the profile of Argentine rock during the 1980s. It was ranked at number two in the Argentine edition of Rolling Stone'''s list of The 100 Greatest Albums of Argentine Rock.

 Overview 
After his first solo tour of Argentina in 1982, García began a new project with his manager Daniel Grinbank. García went to New York to record his next album, with Pedro Aznar, who was living there while playing in the Pat Metheny band. The black silhouette figure on the cover photo for the album is by Conceptual Artist Richard Hambleton who is known as the Shadowman.

Composition
The album has a strong new wave influence, with a significant use of synthesizers and samplers.

The album used a Roland TR-808 drum machine instead of a human drummer, resulting in a more poppy and rhythm-heavy sound than in García's previous work.

Release and promotionClics modernos was released on November 5, 1983 on Interdisc and SG Discos.

García presented the album between December 15 and 18, 1983 at the Luna Park Stadium in Buenos Aires. The concerts featured keyboardist Fito Páez, backing vocalist Fabiana Cantilo, drummer Willy Iturri, bassist Alfredo Toth, guitarist Pablo Guyot and saxophonists Gonzalo Palacios and Daniel Melingo. The performance was acclaimed by specialized magazine Pelo, describing it as "captivating" and considering it one of the greatest shows of the year.

Songs such as "Plateado sobre plateado (huellas en el mar)" were debuted live in early 1983 during a series of concerts at the Estadio Obras Sanitarias.

Reception
In 2008, Rolling Stone Argentina stated that "for many, [it is] Charly's best album, a record that found him on a superlative level".

Accolades

Track listing

 Personnel 
Credits adapted from Clics modernos' liner notes.

Charly García – writer, producer, mixer, vocals, keyboards, sampler, groovebox, effects, rhythm box, electric guitar
Larry Carlton – guitar on "No Soy Un Extraño", "Los Dinosaurios", "Plateado Sobre Plateado (Huellas En El Mar)"
Pedro Aznar – fretless bass guitar (all tracks except "Nuevos Trapos"), vocals and guitar on "Nos Siguen Pegando Abajo (Pecado Mortal)"
Casey Scheuerell – drums on "Bancate Ese Defecto", "No Me Dejan Salir", "Plateado Sobre Plateado (Huellas En El Mar)", Simmons drums on "Nos Siguen Pegando Abajo (Pecado Mortal)", "No Me Dejan Salir", tabla on "Dos Cero Uno (transas)"
Doug Norwine – saxophone on "Nuevos Trapos"
Joe Blaney – engineer, mixing
Ted Jensen – mastering 
Daniel Goldberg – producer assistant
Carlos Pirín Geniso – producer assistant
Don Koldom – auxiliar engineer
Hal Sacks – auxiliar engineer 
Uberto Sagramoso – cover photography
Ada Moreno – inner booklet photography

Notes

Bibliography

External links
 
  statistics, tagging and previews at Last.fm
 Clics modernos'' at Rate Your Music

1983 albums
Spanish-language albums
Charly García albums
Albums recorded at Electric Lady Studios